Aciphylla congesta is a species of Aciphylla. It is endemic to New Zealand.

It was first described by Thomas Frederic Cheeseman in 1914.

References

External links

Apioideae
Endemic flora of New Zealand
Taxa named by Thomas Frederic Cheeseman